Leander was a composite built clipper ship. She was designed by Bernard Waymouth, and built in 1867 by J G Lawrie of Glasgow for Joseph Somes. She had a particularly extreme hull shape, with a coefficient of under-deck tonnage of 0.54, a very low figure. She was at her best in light winds and performed well to windward or in a head sea. Being somewhat tender if pressed in heavy weather, she had to carry so much ballast that she was down to her marks before being fully laden.

Ship history
Before 1871, Leander sailed between London and the Far East (China) and later from China to New York City. She was in the tea trade until 1879. Re-rigged as a barque in the 1890s, the ship was sold to R. Anderson of London, then to Ross & Company. Her last owner was Seyed Youssouf bin Ahmed Zuwawee of Oman and was renamed Nusrool Mujeed in 1895 and broken up in 1901.

References

External links
Painting of tea clipper Leander by Jack Spurling

Tea clippers
Barques
Individual sailing vessels
Victorian-era merchant ships of the United Kingdom
Ships built on the River Clyde
1867 ships